Tankōbon volume 81 and onwards encapsulates all the chapters following chapter 851.



Volume list

Chapters not yet published in volume format
 1092: 
 1093: 
 1094: 
 1095: 
 1096: 
 1097: 
 1098: 
 1099: 
 1100: 
 1101: 
 1102: 
 1103: 
 1104: 
 1105:

References
General

Specific

Case Closed volumes (81-current)